The Karachi Kings is a franchise cricket team that competed  in the 2019 Season. The team is based in Karachi, Sindh, Pakistan in the Pakistan Super League (PSL). The team was coached by Mickey Arthur, and captained by Imad Wasim.

Teams standings

Points table

References 

2019 Pakistan Super League
Kings in 2019
2019